CIRM may refer to:

 California Institute for Regenerative Medicine
 Comité International Radio-Maritime, an international technical association of companies involved in the marine electronics industry
 Centre International de Rencontres Mathématiques, a French mathematical institute devoted to research and the organisation of workshops, in the Calanques National Park near Marseilles
 Centro Internazionale Radio Medico (C.I.R.M. - International Center of Medical Radiocommunications) a non-profit foundation established in Italy in the year 1934 to provide medical advice over radio waves to seafarers and locations without medical services.